Air Bagan Limited was an airline headquartered in Bahan Township, Yangon, Myanmar. It operated domestic scheduled services within Myanmar, as well as to Thailand. Its main bases were Yangon International Airport and Mandalay International Airport.

History 
The airline was established in June 2004 and started operations on 15 November 2004. It was owned by Htoo Trading Co. Ltd. Its first international service was flown from Yangon to Bangkok on 15 May 2007, and the second to Singapore from 7 September 2007. Air Bagan was listed as a Specially Designated National by the United States Department of the Treasury for its association with the Government of Myanmar, meaning U.S. citizens are generally prohibited from dealing with the airline by U.S. sanctions against the government of Myanmar.

When Cyclone Nargis struck Lower Myanmar in May 2008, the Burmese government gave Air Bagan and its parent company, Htoo Trading Co. Ltd responsibility to reconstruct the badly devastated town of Bogale in the Ayeyarwaddy Delta.

In August 2015 Air Bagan announced that it suspended all flights. All flights were then operated by its code-sharing partner Asian Wings, which is also owned by the Htoo Trading Co. Ltd.

The airline ceased operations again and handed back its licence to the authorities in August 2018.

Destinations

Air Bagan served the following destinations:

Myanmar
Ayeyarwady Region
Pathein - Pathein Airport
Kachin State
Myitkyina - Myitkyina Airport
Putao - Putao Airport
Mandalay Region
Bagan - Nyaung U Airport
Mandalay - Mandalay International Airport Base
Naypyidaw - Naypyidaw International Airport 
Rakhine State
Sittwe - Sittwe Airport
Thandwe - Thandwe Airport
Sagaing Region
Kalaymyo - Kalaymyo Airport
Shan State
Heho - Heho Airport
Kengtung - Kengtung Airport
Lashio - Lashio Airport
Tachileik - Tachilek Airport
Tanintharyi Region
Dawei - Dawei Airport
Kawthaung - Kawthaung Airport
Yangon Region
Yangon - Yangon International Airport
Thailand
Chiang Mai - Chiang Mai International Airport

Fleet 
As of 17 November 2021, Air Bagan's fleet included the following aircraft:

Accidents and incidents
On 19 February 2008, an Air Bagan ATR 72 overran the runway at Putao Airport injuring two people.
On 25 December 2012, Air Bagan Flight 11 a Fokker 100 registered XY-AGC, crash-landed near Heho Airport, killing one on board, one on the ground and injuring eleven. Among the injured was the well-known meditation teacher Allan Lokos, who was severely burned during his escape from the crashed aircraft.

See also
List of defunct airlines of Myanmar

References

External links

Official website 
Photos by Airliners.net

Defunct airlines of Myanmar
Airlines established in 2004
Airlines disestablished in 2018
2004 establishments in Myanmar
2018 disestablishments in Asia
Companies based in Yangon
Entities related to Myanmar sanctions